is a city located in Nagasaki Prefecture, Japan. The city was founded on September 1, 1940. As of November 1, 2022, the city has an estimated population of 132,385 and a population density of 389 persons per km².

On March 1, 2005, the towns of Tarami, Moriyama, Iimori, Takaki and Konagai (all from Kitatakaki District) were merged to create the new and expanded city of Isahaya. The city was once part of Kitatakaki District, but due to this merger, the district has no more municipalities left and the district was officially dissolved.

History 
In July 1957, a severe downpour within Nagasaki caused a large flood in Isahaya, with over 500 casualties and 3500 injuries reported in Isahaya alone.

Geography 

Located in the central part of Nagasaki Prefecture. To the north of Isahaya City are mountainous lands of the Takayama mountain range. To the west is the base of the Nagasaki Peninsula and to the south is the base of Shimabara Peninsula. The northeastern part of the city area is surrounded by the three seas of Ōmura Bay in the northwest, Ariake Sea (Isahaya Bay) on the east side and Tachibana Bay on the south side.

Major land reclamation projects have occurred which added plains in the Ariake Sea. The biggest is the Isahaya Bay reclamation project (諫早湾干拓事業) by the Ministry of Agriculture, Forestry and Fisheries that started in 1989. Embankments and sluice gates were built and a total of 35 km2 has been reclaimed as of 2018.

Surrounding municipalities 

 Nagasaki Prefecture
 Nagasaki
 Ōmura
 Unzen
 Nagayo
 Saga Prefecture
 Tara

Education 
Isahaya contains a private university, namely the Nagasaki Wesleyan University. Furthermore, Isahaya have five vocational schools, eight high schools, 16 junior high schools and 28 elementary schools in total.

Transportation

Railways 

 JR Kyushu
 Nagasaki Main Line: Konagai - Nagasato - Yue - Oe - Hizen-Nagata - Higashi-Isahaya - Isahaya - Nishi-Isahaya - Kikitsu - Ichinuno
 Ōmura Line: Isahaya
 Shimabara Railway
 Shimabara Railway Line: Isahaya - Hon-Isahaya - Saiwai - Onohonmachi - Kantakunosato - Moriyama - Kamanohana - Isahaya-higashi-kōkōmae

Highways 

 Nagasaki Expressway
 Japan national route
 Route 34
 Route 57
 Route 207
 Route 251

Sister cities

  Zhangzhou, China
  Athens, Tennessee, United States

References

External links

 Isahaya City official website 

Cities in Nagasaki Prefecture